Cristián Alejandro Contreras Radovic (born 21 December 1969), popularly known as Dr. File, is a Chilean journalist, writer, and philosopher known for spreading  conspiracy theories and pseudosciences in the Chilean media. He is the current leader of the political party United Center, and was also a candidate for becoming a Senator of the Metropolitan Region of Chile.

Biography 
He was born in Viña del Mar and has a sister, Ángela Contreras Radovic, who is an actress and a fellow supporter of the United Center party. His grandfather, Gracija Radović Ercegović (1913-1995) immigrated from Montenegro, Yugoslavia in 1926, when he was only 13 years old. 

He studied journalism at the Gabriela Mistral University and philosophy at the Autonomous University of Barcelona between 1988 and 1999.

In the 1990s he carried started out his professional practice as a journalist on the Chilean television channel La Red and worked as a correspondent for the US network NBC. During 2018, he also worked at the television channel Chilevisión.

Between 2020 and 2021, he worked on creating the party United Centre, which he leads, and he manifiested intentions of becoming a candidate for the 2021 Chilean presidential elections, although he later decided on becoming a candidate to become a senator for the Metropolitan Region instead. 

He is married to Heidi Schulz and has one daughter and two sons.

Views 
Cristián Contreras Radovic has often been the subject of controversy, as he has refused to wear surgical masks during the COVID-19 pandemic, and believes in the popularly-dubbed "plandemic" conspiracy theory, which consists of the idea that the pandemic was artificially created. He is also against the scientific consensus that the HIV virus causes AIDS, instead claiming that it is caused by HIV-treatment drugs. 

He is a self-declared centrist, claiming that "we have to hit the left and the right with a stick" and that "capitalists and communists have been corrupted by power and driven Chile towards the path of resentment, inequality, and a wide array of vices arising from the darkest forms of matter".

Bibliography

References 

1969 births
Living people
People from Viña del Mar
Autonomous University of Barcelona alumni
United Center (Chile) politicians 
Chilean journalists
21st-century Chilean politicians
COVID-19 conspiracy theorists